Spring Grove is a village in McHenry County. Portions of unincorporated Lake County, Illinois also utilize Spring Grove postal addresses. It is a commuter village within the Chicago metropolitan area. Per the 2020 census, the population was 5,487. It is also home to Chain O'Lakes State Park.

The current village president is Mark Eisenberg.

The first tower grain silo was built in Spring Grove in 1873.

Geography
Spring Grove is located at  (42.451031, -88.242589).

Major streets
 S. Hidden Trail
  Kenosha Street
  Rand Road
 Main Street Road
 Winn Road
 Wilmot Road
 Blivin Street/Richardson Road
 English Prairie Road
 Solon Road
 Lakeview Road
Richardson Road

Demographics

2020 census

2000 Census
As of the census of 2000, there were 3,880 people, 1,166 households, and 1,045 families residing in the village. The racial makeup of the village was 97.37% White, 0.13% African American, 0.15% Native American, 0.90% Asian, 0.10% Pacific Islander, 0.36% from other races, and 0.98% from two or more races. Hispanic or Latino of any race were 1.78% of the population.

There were 1,166 households, out of which 54.5% had children under the age of 18 living with them, 84.5% were married couples living together, 3.7% had a female householder with no husband present, and 10.3% were non-families. 7.5% of all households were made up of individuals, and 2.2% had someone living alone who was 65 years of age or older. The average household size was 3.33 and the average family size was 3.52.

In the village, the population was spread out, with 35.3% under the age of 18, 4.9% from 18 to 24, 33.7% from 25 to 44, 20.8% from 45 to 64, and 5.3% who were 65 years of age or older. The median age was 34 years. For every 100 females, there were 100.8 males. For every 100 females age 18 and over, there were 96.9 males.

The median income for a household in the village was $80,542, and the median income for a family was $82,996. Males had a median income of $60,933 versus $33,882 for females. The per capita income for the village was $25,506. About 1.7% of families and 2.4% of the population were below the poverty line, including 2.3% of those under age 18 and none of those age 65 or over.

Notable people 

Brooke Barrettsmith, contestant on the reality television show American Idol during its fifth season in 2006
 Nick Etten, first baseman for the Philadelphia Athletics, Philadelphia Phillies and New York Yankees
David Kagan, Bishop of the Roman Catholic Diocese of Bismarck, North Dakota, grew up in Spring Grove. 
 Bobby Klaus, infielder for the Cincinnati Reds and New York Mets; born in Spring Grove

References

External links
 Spring Grove official website
 Spring Company in Spring Grove, Illinois official website
 The Illinois Storytelling Festival  Annual storytelling festival in August

Villages in McHenry County, Illinois
Villages in Illinois
Chicago metropolitan area
Populated places established in 1902